not to be confused with Axixá do Tocantins in Tocantins State

Axixá is a municipality in the state of Maranhão in the Northeast region of Brazil. The main town lies on the left bank of the Munim River, upstream from Icatu.

The municipality contains part of the  Upaon-Açu/Miritiba/Alto Preguiças Environmental Protection Area, created in 1992.

See also
List of municipalities in Maranhão

References

External links
Official site 

Municipalities in Maranhão